Pietro Valpreda (29 September 1932 – 6 July 2002) was an Italian anarchist, poet, dancer and novelist. 

He was sentenced to prison on charges of being responsible of the December 1969 Piazza Fontana bombing; in 1987 was acquitted by the Supreme Court of Cassation for lack of evidence.

Life
Valpreda came from a poor working-class family in Milan, and, after the end of his formal education, attended dance school. He made his living as a minor dancer on stage. He moved to Rome in 1969 where he frequented the "Bakunin Circle", before founding with several friends the "".

Following the December 12, 1969 Piazza Fontana bombing, carried out in the middle of the autunno caldo of 1969 (Hot Autumn), he was arrested by the police. A taxi driver testified to having seen him on the Piazza a short time before the bombing, which left 17 dead and 88 injured. His testimony was not considered reliable, even if made in good faith. Another anarchist, Giuseppe Pinelli, was also arrested for the bombing, and died after falling from a fourth-floor window a few days later, while he was illegally detained by the police. 
 
Pietro Valpreda's name was splashed across the media as "the monster of Piazza Fontana" and the television reporter Bruno Vespa claimed that "the guilty man has been found". For three years, he languished in jail, awaiting trial. All over Italy, there were huge pro-Valpreda demonstrations and the trial was moved to the deep south, to avoid "political interference". Valpreda published his prison diaries, entitled It Is Him – the words used by the alleged witness, taxi driver Cornelio Rolandi.

The criminal trial started at Rome on February 23, 1972: the Italian Judiciary took 15 years to exonerate Valpreda, when he was acquitted for lack of evidence, and 29 years to find someone else guilty of the bombing. It was later found out that the culprits of the bombing were actually neofascists and Ordine Nuovo members.

After his release, Valpreda continued to work as a dancer and opened a bar in Milano.

See also
List of miscarriage of justice cases

References

1933 births
2002 deaths
Dancers from Milan
Italian anarchists
Individualist anarchists
Italian prisoners and detainees
Overturned convictions in Italy
Years of Lead (Italy)